WOPI (1490 AM) is a sports formatted broadcast radio station licensed to Bristol, Tennessee, and Bristol, Virginia, United States.  WOPI is owned and operated by Glenwood Communications Corporation though subsidiary Holston Valley Broadcasting Corporation.

History
WOPI signed on June 15, 1929 at State and 22nd Streets in Bristol, Tennessee, as the first radio station in the Tri-Cities. W.A. Wilson, former chief telegraph operator for Western Union's Bristol office, came up with the plan for a radio station when he spent several years selling and installing radios. His son James C. Wilson worked at WOPI and later bought the station which is now WJCW. An early show on the station was "WOPI Jamboree", which featured live country music. In the 1940s, WOPI and WKPT formed a network called "the Sister City Network" for broadcasting local information.

WOPI-FM signed on Christmas Day 1946 as the area's first FM station. It was sold to the owner of WKYE in the 1960s and is now WXBQ-FM.

In 1966, owner Tri-Cities Broadcasting Company successfully requested that the FCC change the city of license to Bristol, Tennessee-Virginia.

In 1990, WOPI was bankrupt and Joe Morrell bought the station. Morrell wanted to increase the amount of country music on the station, bringing it back to its roots. Later, WOPI joined the WKPT network.

Translator
In addition to the main station, WOPI is relayed by an FM translator to widen its broadcast area.

References

External links
ESPN Tri-Cities Online

OPI
OPI
Sports radio stations in the United States
Radio stations established in 1929
1929 establishments in Tennessee
1929 establishments in Virginia
ESPN Radio stations